Callow is an English surname. Notable people with the surname include: 

Christos Callow (born 1955), Greek singer
Eleanor Callow (born 1927), former Canadian baseball player
Henry Callow (died 2006), Manx judge
Keith M. Callow (1925–2008), Associate Justice of the Washington Supreme Court
Kenneth Callow (1901–1983), British biochemist
Paul Callow (born c. 1955), convicted Canadian rapist
Simon Callow (born 1949), English actor
William Callow, (1812–1908), British painter
William G. Callow (1921–2018), Associate Justice of the Wisconsin Supreme Court

Fictional characters
June Callow, fictional character in Black Mirror
Michael Callow, fictional character in Black Mirror

See also 
 Charlie Calow (born 1931), Northern Irish footballer